The tenth season of Degrassi  premiered in Canada on July 19, 2010, concluded on April 22, 2011, and consists of 44 episodes. Degrassi is a Canadian serial teen drama television series. Previously known as Degrassi: The Next Generation, the suffix "the Next Generation" was dropped this season, due to the original next generation of students having all been written out. With the start of the tenth season, the series survived longer than the nine-year gap between Degrassi Highs telemovie School's Out, and Degrassi’s premiere episode "Mother and Child Reunion".

Though only two school years have passed in the story timeline since season six, season ten is set from the fall semester through the first term of the spring semester, in which the years it aired. Writers were able to use a semi-floating timeline, so that the issues depicted are modern for their viewers. 
This season depicts the lives of a group of high school sophomores, juniors, seniors, and graduates as they deal with some of the challenges and issues that teenagers face such as domestic violence, dysfunctional families, self image, bullying, sexual harassment, gender identity/transsexualism, teenage pregnancy, online predators, homophobia, school violence, divorce, religion, kidney failure, self-harm, alcoholism, sexual identity, financial difficulties, running away and relationships.

This season doubled the order of episodes, and switched to a telenovela/soap opera format, with the show airing new episodes four days a week, for the first 24 episodes. Production for the season began on March 26, 2010 at Epitome Pictures' studios in Toronto, Ontario. This was the first season not to air on broadcast television. It is also the first season to have simultaneous airings in Canada and the United States. This was the earliest start to a season. In the US, the first 24 episodes of season ten were promoted as Degrassi: The Boiling Point, while the final twelve episodes of the season were promoted as Degrassi: In Too Deep'''. The fifth Degrassi dedicated soundtrack, Degrassi: The Boiling Point, was released February 1, 2011.

Cast and characters

The tenth season features twenty-four actors who receive star billing with sixteen of them returning from the previous season. Returning cast members include:

 Raymond Ablack as Savtaj "Sav" Bhandari (33 episodes)
 Charlotte Arnold as Holly J. Sinclair (33 episodes) 
 Stefan Brogren as Archie "Snake" Simpson (20 episodes)
 Annie Clark as Fiona Coyne (26 episodes)
 Sam Earle as K.C. Guthrie (25 episodes)
 Jahmil French as Dave Turner (29 episodes)
 Judy Jiao as Leia Chang (2 episodes)
 Jamie Johnston as Peter Stone (4 episodes)
 Argiris Karras as Riley Stavros (13 episodes)
 Landon Liboiron as Declan Coyne (9 episodes)
 Jajube Mandiela as Chantay Black (19 episodes)
 Samantha Munro as Anya MacPherson (27 episodes)
 Aislinn Paul as Clare Edwards (35 episodes)
 A.J. Saudin as Connor DeLaurier (20 episodes)
 Melinda Shankar as Alli Bhandari (31 episodes)
 Jessica Tyler as Jenna Middleton (24 episodes)

Beginning this season, Stefan Brogren is the only original cast member remaining in the series.

Joining the main cast this season are:

 Luke Bilyk as Drew Torres (26 episodes)
 Munro Chambers as Eli Goldsworthy (27 episodes)
 Alicia Josipovic as Bianca DeSousa (19 episodes)
 Cory Lee as Ms. Oh (25 episodes)
 Jordan Todosey as Adam Torres (25 episodes)
 Spencer Van Wyck as Wesley Betenkamp (28 episodes) (promoted after appearing in a season nine episode) 

Half-way through the season, recurring actors Shannon Kook-Chun and Daniel Kelly who play Zane Park (13 episodes) and Owen Milligan (12 episodes) were promoted to the main cast while Jamie Johnston and Judy Jiao departed.

The nine actors from season nine who did not return this season were: 

 Dalmar Abuzeid as Danny Van Zandt
 Paula Brancati as Jane Vaughn
 Jordan Hudyma as Blue Chessex
 Shane Kippel as Gavin "Spinner" Mason
 Mike Lobel as Jay Hogart
 Miriam McDonald as Emma Nelson
 Scott Paterson as Johnny DiMarco
 Cassie Steele as Manuela "Manny" Santos
 Natty Zavitz as Bruce the Moose

All left the series except for Scott Paterson, who made a guest appearance in the season and Shane Kippel who made a guest appearance in season 14.

Crew
Season ten was produced by Epitome Pictures in association with Much/CTV. Funding was provided by The Canadian Media Fund, RBC Royal Bank, The Shaw Rocket Fund, The Independent Production Fund: Mountain Cable Program, The Canadian Film or Video Production Tax Credit, and the Ontario Film and Television Tax Credit.

Linda Schuyler, co-creator of the Degrassi franchise and CEO of Epitome Pictures, served as an executive producer with her husband, and President of Epitome Pictures, Stephen Stohn. Brendon Yorke is also credited as an executive producer, and Sarah Glinski is credited as a co-executive producer. David Lowe and Stefan Brogren are the producers, and Stephanie Williams the supervising producer. The casting director is Stephanie Gorin, and the editors are Jason B. Irvine, Gordon Thorne, and Paul Whitehead.

The executive story editors are Duana Taha and Matt Huether, the story editors are Michael Grassi and Cole Bastedo, and Lauren Gosnell is the story coordinator. Episode writers for the season are Cole Bastedo, Sarah Glinski, Michael Grassi, Matt Huether, James Hurst, Vera Santamaria, Shelly Scarrow, Duana Taha, and Brendon Yorke. The director of photography is Alwyn Kumst, and the directors are Mario Azzopardi, Stefan Brogren, Phil Earnshaw, Sturla Gunnarsson, Eleanore Lindo, Samir Rehem, Stefan Scaini, and Pat Williams.

Episodes
The first run, of 24 episodes, began after the feature-length film Degrassi Takes Manhattan in July 2010, and ran for six weeks. This is also the first season that the episodes aired on the same nights in Canada and the United States, with the exception being the first week, when the United States was one day behind Canada. This is the first time that the opening credits have been revised halfway through the season, and was repeated for season 11 and 12.

Reception
Ratings
In Canada, more than one million viewers tuned in to watch the first four episodes.

AccoladesDegrassi was nominated for a GLAAD Media Award in the Best Drama Series category, alongside Brothers & Sisters, Grey's Anatomy, Pretty Little Liars, and the winner True Blood. These awards, honouring works that fairly and accurately represent the LGBT community and issues, were announced March 19, 2011.

The two-part episode "My Body Is a Cage", centering on transgender character Adam's struggles with his family over his gender identity, won a 2010 Peabody Award for presenting its subject in a manner that "neither trivializes nor overdramatizes its subject". It also received a nomination for a Primetime Emmy Award in the outstanding children's program category, alongside iCarly, Victorious, Wizards of Waverly Place, and winner A Child's Garden of Poetry.

In the 26th Gemini Awards, Linda Schuyler, Stefan Brogren, David Lowe, Stephen Stohn, Stephanie Williams, and Brendon Yorke, won an award for best children's or youth fiction program or series, for producing Degrassi. Directors Phil Earnshaw and Pat Williams were nominated for "My Body Is a Cage (Part 2)" and "All Falls Down (Part 2)" respectively, for best direction in a children's or youth program or series, "All Falls Down (Part 2)" would win. "My Body Is a Cage (Part 2)" would win a Gemini for Jordan Todosey (Adam Torres) in best performance in a children's or youth program or series, however the writer, Michael Grassi, lost to an episode of Spliced'', an animated series, for writing in a children's or youth program or series. At the 2011 Young Artist Awards, A.J. Saudin was nominated as a Recurring Young Actor in the Best Performance in a TV Series.

DVD releases

References

External links
 List of Degrassi: The Next Generation episodes at IMDb.

Degrassi: The Next Generation seasons
Degrassi (Season 10)
2010 Canadian television seasons
2011 Canadian television seasons